National Highway 56B or NH 56B, the former national highway started at NH 56 km 16 and ended at NH 25 km 19 in Uttar Pradesh, India. The total length of the highway is 19 km and runs only in the state of Uttar Pradesh.

See also
 List of National Highways in India (by Highway Number)
 List of National Highways in India
 National Highways Development Project

References

External links
NH 9 on OpenStreetMap

56B
National highways in India (old numbering)